Bloody Brothers is an Indian Dark Comedy web-series written by Siddharth Hirwe, Anuj Rajoria, Riya Poojary, Navnit Singh Raju and directed by Shaad Ali. It is a remake of the Scottish television series, Guilt. This web-series is produced by Applause Entertainment Pvt. Ltd starring Jaideep Ahlawat, Mohammed Zeeshan Ayyub, Tina Desai, Shruti Seth, Jitendra Joshi, Maya Alagh, and Satish Kaushik. Bloody Brothers is released on ZEE5 on 18 March 2022.

Synopsis 
Two brothers, Jaggi and Daljeet, who are poles apart, accidentally kill an old man on a darkened residential street. They manage to conceal their crime, but, when the people around them start to suspect, the brothers’ lives start falling apart. They soon find that they cannot trust anyone. Not even each other.

Cast 
 Jaideep Ahlawat as Jaggi Grover 
 Mohammed Zeeshan Ayyub as Daljit Grover
 Tina Desai as Sophie
 Shruti Seth as Priya Grover
 Mugdha Godse as Tanya
 Yuri Suri as Mr Yuri
 Jitendra Joshi as Dushyant
 Maya Alagh as Shiela
 Satish Kaushik as Handa
 Asrani as Samuel Alvarez

Reception 
Saibal Chatterjee from Ndtv gave three star out five stars stating " A thriller that shuns the usual trappings of the genre. No blowouts, no gunfights, no chases, no heavy-handed confrontations - it thrives on sustained restraint." Archika Khurana from Times of India said " Jaideep Ahlawat & Zeeshan Ayyub's nuanced chemistry powers this dark comedy." Shefali Deshpande of Quint stated "This Dark Comedy Is the Perfect Weekend Binge".  Nikita Thakkar from Bollywoodlife gave three out of five stars and  wrote " Jaideep Ahlawat and Mohammed Zeeshan Ayyub shine in this complicated thriller."  Iraa Paul from DNA gave three stars out of five stars stating Mohd Zeeshan Ayyub, Jaideep Ahlawat starrer is intriguing but slow-paced." Nandini Ramnath from Scroll wrote "Jaideep Ahlawat and Zeeshan Ayyub sparkle in black comedy."

Episodes

References

External links

Indian web series
Crime thriller web series
Indian crime television series
Hindi-language television shows
Indian thriller television series